ASEAN Hymn (official name ASEAN Song of Unity) was the hymn of the Association of Southeast Asian Nations. The lyrics were written by Nicanor Tiongson and the music was composed by Ryan Cayabyab. The ASEAN Hymn was the unofficial ASEAN anthem until the adoption of the official anthem, The ASEAN Way.

Lyrics 
ASEAN, oh ASEAN,
Our voices rise as one,
From land to land, from sea to sea,
Reach out for everyone.

ASEAN, oh ASEAN,
Let's link our arms and stand,

Reff:
Behold the sun has risen to,
The level of our eyes.
Behold the sun has risen to,
The level of our eyes.

Notes

External links 
 Download the song (from ASEAN Homepage).

ASEAN
Asian anthems
Year of song missing